Darrell Williams may refer to:

 Darrell Williams (rugby league), New Zealand rugby league selector, player and coach
 Darrell Williams (American football) (born 1993), American football offensive tackle, currently a free agent
 Darrell Williams Jr. (born 1993), American football offensive tackle, for the Los Angeles Rams
 Darrell Williams (basketball) (born 1989), American basketball player
 Darrell K. Williams, United States Army general

See also
 Darrel Williams (born 1995), American football running back
 Darryl Williams (disambiguation)
 Daryl Williams (disambiguation)